Princess Marie Alix of Schaumburg-Lippe (Marie Alix zu Schaumburg-Lippe; 2 April 1923 – 1 November 2021) was Duchess of Schleswig-Holstein as the wife of  from 1965 to 1980.

Biography

Family
She was the niece of Adolf II, the last ruler of the Principality of Schaumburg-Lippe who abdicated following the German Revolution of 1918–1919 and the Principality became the Free State of Schaumburg-Lippe. Marie Alix's younger brother, Prince Georg Moritz of Schaumburg-Lippe, was killed in a car accident in 1970 without marrying or having children.

Marriage and issue
Marie Alix married Peter, Duke of Schleswig-Holstein, third son of Wilhelm Friedrich, Duke of Schleswig-Holstein and his wife Princess Marie Melita of Hohenlohe-Langenburg in Glücksburg on 9 October 1947. Peter and Marie Alix had four children:
 (born 5 September 1948 in Schleswig), she married Wilfred Eberhard Manfred Baron von Plotho (born 1942) in 1975. They have two children.
Christoph, Prince of Schleswig-Holstein (born 22 August 1949 in Eckernförde), he married Princess Elisabeth of Lippe-Weissenfeld (born 1957) in 1981. They have four children.
Alexander, Prince of Schleswig-Holstein (born 9 July 1953 in Thumby), he married Barbara Fertsch (1961–2009) in 1994. They had two children.
Princess Ingeborg of Schleswig-Holstein (born 9 July 1956 in Thumby), she married Nicolas Broschek (born 1942) in 1991. They have one child, a son.

Death and funeral
Princess Marie Alix of Schaumburg-Lippe died in Thumby on 1 November 2021 at the age of 98.

References

1923 births
2021 deaths
German Protestants
Marie Alix
People from Bückeburg